Dahlica triquetrella is a bagworm moth of the Psychidae family. It is found in Europe and North America.

The wingspan is 9–13 mm for males. Females are wingless. Though winged males occur in some sites in Europe, only the parthenogenetic wingless female form of Dahlica triquetrella has been recorded in Britain. The adult lives a very short time.

The larvae feed on lichen and algae on trunks, rocks and old walls. This diet has to be supplemented by dead insects for development to be successful. The larva is active as the snow melts in Europe.

Gallery

External links
Ukmoths
Bug Guide
Lepiforum.de
Swedish Moths

Psychidae
Moths of Europe
Insects of Turkey
Taxa named by Jacob Hübner
Moths described in 1813